Hypothenemus seriatus is a species of typical bark beetle in the family Curculionidae.

References

Further reading

External links

 

Scolytinae
Beetles described in 1992